Mark Ireland (born 1 January 1960 in Sydney, Australia) is an Australian artist, composer, musician, film and video maker and member of Clan Analogue the Australian Artists collective.

Life and career
Mark started playing professionally at 19 years of age with the band Straight Angles playing jazz, soul, pop and rock.

He produced a compact disc called Straight Angles Compilation and took it to London, New York and Tokyo. It included original compositions created with the Fairlight C.M.I. Computer Music Instrument.
He formed the group Carrier and released a compact disc titled 'The Foley Artists' that is available at CDBaby. 
Remixes are available at BandCamp.

Discography
Mark Ireland's original music is mainly Electronic Music although it often includes orchestral instruments.

Straight Angles Compilation – 1988 
Clan Analogue EP2 – EP release
Freaky Loops – 2SER release
CA014: COGNITION Various Artists
CA038: RE COGNITION – THE CLAN ANALOGUE LEGACY COLLECTION Various Artists
InTone – Clan Analogue – 2016

References

1960 births
Australian musicians
Living people